The Christ Church, Rawalpindi  is a church situated in the city of Rawalpindi, Pakistan. It was built in 1852 in the gothic style. The church is situated in Lalkurti in cantonment area on Iftikhar Janjua Road beside PC Hotel. The church is considered among the oldest buildings in Rawalpindi.

References 

Churches in Pakistan
Church of Pakistan church buildings in Pakistan
Rawalpindi District
Churches completed in 1852
1852 establishments in British India